Telehash is a mesh networking protocol that aims to be secure. The protocol is licensed under the Creative Commons Public domain.

Telehash implementations were still in development by 2014. As a security-sensitive application, it has yet to receive a third-party security review. TeleHash is similar to Resilio Sync in that it allows users of the software to share data securely without any central server authority. There are implementations in C, Python, Ruby, Erlang, JavaScript, Go, and Objective-C.

Telehash is used in the Locker project,  and was planned to be used as a communication and file transfer mechanism in Git-annex.

See also 
 BitTorrent Sync
 Locker (software)

References

External links 
 telehash.org homepage
 telehash history

Peer-to-peer file sharing
Data synchronization
File sharing software
Network protocols
Public-domain software with source code